Eva Hanagan  (born Eva Ross; 10 November 1923 – 9 January 2009) was a British literary novelist and teacher of writing. She had seven novels published between 1977 and 1998.

Early life and education
Hanagan was born in Inverness, Scotland to James MacDonald Ross and Janet Alice Ross. The youngest of four children, she grew up in Tarnash. Hanagan was educated at the Inverness Royal Academy, where she regularly appeared in the top five places for her grade, although childhood asthma kept her away from school for extended periods.  She was an accomplished pianist and spoke French, German, and Russian.

At age 19, Hanagan ended her education and became involved with the Common Wealth Party, serving as the Highlands branch secretary.  The party was based on socialist ideals, which Hanagan embraced throughout her life.

Career
Hanagan joined the Foreign and Commonwealth Office and in March 1946 was posted to Vienna to join the Allied Commission for Austria. She worked in the legal division on the de-nazification of Austrian law and the prosecution of war crimes. Following her experience in Vienna, Hanagan said: "Its never really bright morning again. You see the absolute depth of human depravity".

Hanagan's first publisher was Colin Haycraft at Duckworth Overlook, who declared that "he never had to correct a word of hers." Auberon Waugh described her as the "Jane Austen of the 20th century," though, according to Susan Chitty, writing in The Guardian, her work was "comedy of a darker hue".

Hanagan later developed material for writing classes, tutored writing classes, and led a creative writing program at HM Prison Ford in Sussex. Shw was the first ever writer in residence appointed by the Home office. In addition she was a member of the society of Sussex authors and published texts for the Writers Bureau (1988).

Personal life
Hanagan was married to Major John Hanagan, and as a "service wife," lived in Europe and the Middle East.  The couple had two children, Patrick and Alistair.

Eva Hanagan died in London on 9 January 2009.

Bibliography

Novels 

 In Thrall                       Duckworth (1977 )                   Odyssey Press  (2016 ) 
 Playmates                      Duckworth (1978).                   Odyssey Press  (2017)
 The Upas Tree              Constable (1979).                     Odyssey Press  (2017)
 Holding On                   Constable (1980)                       Endeavour Press ( 2016)
 A knock at the door      Constable (1982).                      Odyssey Press  ( 2017)
 Alice                             Warner Books (1997).                Odyssey Press ( 2016)
 The Daisy Rock          Warner Books (1998).                Odyssey Press (2017)

Short stories 
 New stories                  The Arts Council. ( 1976)
 The thirteenth ghost book    Barrie and Jenkins  (1997)

Literary criticism 
 Handbook on writing a novel  The Writers Bureau ( 1988 )

References 

1923 births
2009 deaths
People educated at Inverness Royal Academy
20th-century Scottish women writers
21st-century Scottish writers
21st-century Scottish women writers
20th-century Scottish educators
21st-century Scottish educators
Scottish women educators
20th-century Scottish novelists
21st-century Scottish novelists
20th-century short story writers
21st-century short story writers
Scottish short story writers
British women short story writers
People from Inverness
20th-century women educators
21st-century women educators